Paul Ehrlich (1854–1915) was a German scientist and physician.

Paul Ehrlich may also refer to:

 Paul R. Ehrlich (born 1932), American biologist and commentator on world population
 S. Paul Ehrlich Jr. (1932–2005), American physician and public health administrator

See also
 Paul Erlich (born 1972), American music theorist